Edson Luiz de Carvalho (born 21 October 1941), known as Edson Borracha, is a Brazilian former footballer.

References

1941 births
Living people
Association football goalkeepers
Brazilian footballers
Fluminense FC players
Pan American Games medalists in football
Pan American Games silver medalists for Brazil
Footballers at the 1959 Pan American Games
Medalists at the 1959 Pan American Games